The Ohio State University Agricultural Technical Institute (Ohio State ATI) is a satellite campus of Ohio State University in Wooster, Ohio. It grants associate degrees from the university's College of Food, Agricultural, and Environmental Sciences. The institute practices open admissions. The curriculum includes general and basic studies that are applied and technical courses, and a paid industry internship. Ohio State ATI is the largest institution of its kind in the U.S., enrolling approximately 500 students and offering 31 programs of study. The university's Ohio Agricultural Research and Development Center is adjacent to the campus.

Ohio State ATI awarded the most associate degrees in agricultural and related sciences in the nation among two-year institutions in 2011–2012.

Academics
Ohio State ATI offers Certificates of Competency, Associate of Applied Science, and Associate of Science degrees.

References

External links
 Official website

Colleges, schools, and departments of Ohio State University
Ohio State University campuses
Education in Wayne County, Ohio
Buildings and structures in Wayne County, Ohio
Two-year colleges in the United States
Satellite campuses
1969 establishments in Ohio